"The Motive", also titled as "The Motive (Living Without You)", is a song by English rock band Then Jerico, released as a single from their debut album, First (The Sound of Music). The song was their first hit single, reaching the top 20 and peaking at No. 18 on the UK Singles Chart in July 1987.

Music video

The official music video for the song was directed by Andy Morahan.

Track listing
12" single
A. "The Motive" (Extended) - 5:55
B1. "The Word" - 3:51
B2. "The Motive" (Midnight Mix) - 5:55

Charts

References

1987 songs
1987 singles
London Records singles
Music videos directed by Andy Morahan
Song recordings produced by Mark Shaw (singer)
Songs written by Mark Shaw (singer)
Then Jerico songs